The Gallery Golf Club is located east of Marana, Arizona, northwest of Tucson at Dove Mountain. The two 18-hole courses are approximately seven miles east of Interstate 10 at an average elevation of 2875 feet (850 m) above sea level. The Ritz-Carlton Dove Mountain sits to the Northwest.

The Gallery North Course is ranked #1 in Southern Arizona by Golf Digest and is acknowledged as one of Golfweeks Top 100 Modern Courses. The Gallery South Course opened in December 2003 and was nominated as one of Golf Digests 100 Best. It is best known for hosting the WGC-Accenture Match Play Championship, in 2007 and 2008.

The Gallery is notable for having the longest par 5 in North America; the ninth hole is measured at a length of 725 yards.

WGC-Accenture Match Play Championship winners at The Gallery
 2008  Tiger Woods
 2007  Henrik Stenson

The Gallery is still the only facility in Arizona where Tiger Woods has won an event as a professional.

Ownership
From its inception in 1998 until 2016, The Gallery Golf Club was owned and developed by members of the MacMillan family (descendants of the Cargill family). The club was sold to Escalante Golf, Inc. in December 2016.

References

External links
 Gallery Golf.com – official site
 World Golf Championships.com – official site
 2002 aerial photo (no south course) & topographic map from USGS via Microsoft Research Maps

Golf clubs and courses in Arizona
Buildings and structures in Pima County, Arizona
Tourist attractions in Pima County, Arizona